Forgas Band Phenomena is a French instrumental progressive rock and jazz fusion band.

Inspired by Soft Machine and the Canterbury scene, composer and drummer Patrick Forgas has created the band and is still leading it.

Since 2005, his albums are edited by the American label Cuneiform.

Career

Current line-up
Patrick Forgas,  drums
Sébastien Trognon, tenor, alto and soprano sax, flute
 Dimitri Alexaline, trumpet, flugelhorn
 Benjamin Violet, guitar (up to March 2013)
 Karolina Mlodecka, violin
Igor Brover, keyboards
Kengo Mochizuki, bass guitar
From April 2013, Pierre Schmidt replaces Benjamin Violet, who has joined Tryo as a multi-instrumentist.

Discography

Forgas
Cocktail (1977)  (2008 reissue by Musea  w/ 13 prev. unissued numbers from 1973–79)
L’œil (1990)
Art d’Écho (1993)
Synchronicité (solo) (2002)

Forgas Band Phenomena
Roue libre (1997)
Extra-Lucide (1999)
Soleil 12 (Live) (2005)
L’Axe du Fou – Axis of Madness (2009)
Acte V  (2012) (+ dvd from their NEARfest gig on June 19, 2010)
L'Oreille Electrique [The Electric Ear] (2018)

Forgas singles
Monks (La danse des moines) / Cocktail (1977)
Miroir tu triches / À fond la caisse (1982)
C'est comme ça la vie / ...Sex move ! (1986)

Guest appearances
Africa Anteria on 2 cd Hur ! Hommage à la musique de Christian Vander (2009)

Filmography
 2015: Romantic Warriors III: Canterbury Tales (DVD)

Musicians

	1997 - Roue Libre.

 Déclic - 6:14
 Sérum De Vérité - 18:30
 Roue Libre - 20:10

All by P.Forgas.

 Mathias Desmier: guitar.
 Philippe Talet: bass.
 Patrick Forgas: drums, electronics.
 Mireille Bauer: vibraphone, marimba.
 Stéphane Jaoui: keyboards, rhodes.
 Frédéric Schmidely: tenor & soprano saxes; flute.

	1999 - Extra-Lucide.

 Extra-Lucide - 7:05
 Rebirth - 5:24
 Pieuvre À La Pluie - 18:24
 Annie Réglisse - 8:35
 Villa Carmen - 4:58

All by P.Forgas.

 Mathias Desmier: guitar.
 Juan-Sebastien Jimenez: bass.
 Patrick Forgas: drums.
 Gilles Pausanias: keyboards.
 Denis Guivarc'h: alto sax.

	2005 - Soleil 12.

 Soleil 12 - 9:22
 Coup De Théâtre - 34:47
 Éclipse - 8:16
 Pieuvre À La Pluie - 18:18

All by P.Forgas.

 Sylvain Ducloux: guitar.
 Kengo Mochizuki: bass.
 Patrick Forgas: drums.
 Igor Brover: keyboards.
 Denis Guivarc'h: alto sax.
 Stanislas De Nussac: tenor & soprano saxes.
 Sylvain Gontard: trumpet, flugelhorn.
 Frédéric Norel: violin.

	2009 - L'Axe Du Fou · Axis Of Madness.

 La Clef (The Key) - 10:50
 L'Axe Du Fou (Axis Of Madness) - 16:32
 Double-Sens (Double Entendre) - 13:50
 La 13eme Lune (The 13th Moon) - 8:24

All by P.Forgas.

 Benjamin Violet: guitar.
 Kengo Mochizuki: bass.
 Patrick Forgas: drums.
 Igor Brover: keyboards.
 Sébastien Trognon: tenor & soprano saxes; flute.
 Dimitri Alexaline: trumpet, flugelhorn.
 Karolina Mlodecka: violin.

	2012 - Acte V.

	Acte V (CD)
 Corps Et Âmes	6:26
 Loin D'Issy	7:14
 George V	10:27
 Ultraviolet	8:18
 Feu Sacré	6:50
 Midi-Minuit	13:30
	NEARFest 2010 (DVD)
 Ultraviolet	8:34
 L'Axe Du Fou	16:06
 Feu Sacré	6:53
 Soleil 12	9:09
 Double Sens	13:38
 Extralucide	10:20
 Éclipse	7:45

All by P.Forgas.

 Benjamin Violet: guitar.
 Kengo Mochizuki: bass.
 Patrick Forgas: drums.
 Igor Brover: keyboards.
 Sébastien Trognon: alto & soprano saxes; flute.
 Dimitri Alexaline: trumpet, flugelhorn.
 Karolina Mlodecka: violin.

	2018 - L’Oreille Électrique = The Electric Ear.

 Délice Karmâ = Karmic Delights - 9:59
 Septième Ciel = Seventh Heaven - 10:02
 L’Oreille Électrique = The Electric Ear - 12:00
 Crème Anglaise = Custard Sauce - 9:37
 Pierre Angulaire = Corner Stone - 12:34

All by P.Forgas.

 Pierre Schmidt: guitar.
 Gérard Prévost: bass.
 Patrick Forgas: drums.
 Igor Brover: keyboards, rhodes.
 Sébastien Trognon: tenor, alto & soprano saxes; flute.
 Dimitri Alexaline: trumpet, flugelhorn.
 Karolina Mlodecka: violin.

References

External links
 Official site
   biography
Biography on allmusic.com--
  Critique de l'album Soleil 12 et interview de Patrick Forgas 
  Critique de l'album L'Axe du Fou

French progressive rock groups